, is located to the north of Miyako Island in Okinawa Prefecture, Japan. The island is connected to Miyako Island with a  bridge, which was completed in February 1992. There is a pond in the centre of the island. The variety of Miyakoan language spoken here is also called Ikema (Ikima in the vernacular). It is set apart from closely related language variants by its lexical word-tone system.

See also

 Ikema Wetland
 Sakishima Beacons

References

 
Islands of Okinawa Prefecture
Miyako Islands